(Blessed is the man), 57, is a church cantata by Johann Sebastian Bach. He wrote the Christmas cantata in Leipzig in 1725 for the Second Day of Christmas, which was celebrated that year as St. Stephen's Day, and first performed it on 26 December 1725.

History and text 
Bach wrote the cantata in his third year in Leipzig for the Second Day of Christmas. That year, as every other year in Leipzig, the day was the feast of the martyr St. Stephanus (Stephen). The prescribed readings for the day are from the Acts, the Martyrdom of Stephen, and from the Gospel of Matthew, Jerusalem killing her prophets. The cantata text was written by Georg Christian Lehms, who drew on all the readings and connected them to more biblical allusions. Lehms set the development as a dialogue of "Jesus" and the Soul ("Anima"). He intended to use as a closing chorale a verse from Johann Heermann's "", but Bach instead chose the 6th verse of Ahasverus Fritsch's "", called  (Talk of the soul with Christ), in order to continue the dialogue.

Bach first performed the cantata on 26 December 1725.

Scoring and structure 

The setting for the cantata in seven movements is intimate: soprano and bass soloists, two oboes, oboe da caccia, two violins, viola, and continuo. A four-part choir is only needed for the closing chorale, if at all. The oboes play only in the first and last movement, doubling the strings.

 Aria (bass): 
 Recitative (soprano): 
 Aria (soprano): 
 Recitative (soprano, bass): 
 Aria (bass): 
 Recitative (soprano, bass): 
 Aria (soprano): 
 Chorale:

Music 
The music for the dialogue of Jesus and the Soul is more dramatic than in other church cantatas by Bach. Most of the recitatives are secco, as in the opera of the time, driving the action. John Eliot Gardiner sees Bach here as the "best writer of dramatic declamation (recitative in other words) since Monteverdi". The first aria is dominated by long vocal phrases. In the second aria the longing for death is expressed by an upwards line followed by a wide interval down. The third aria shows Jesus as the victor by fanfare-like broken triads. In the last aria the line of the solo violin can be interpreted as the passionate movement of the Anima into the arms of Jesus. After a mystical union is reached in the second part of the aria, "" ("My Savior, I die with the greatest eagerness"), no da capo is possible; the aria ends on the question "?" ("what will You give me?"), answered by the final four-part chorale on the tune of "".

Recordings 
 Willem Mengelberg – Volume 1 (J. S. Bach), Willem Mengelberg, Concertgebouw Orchestra, Jo Vincent, Max Kloos, Mengelberg Edition 1940
 Bach Made in Germany Vol. 1 – Cantatas I, Günther Ramin, Thomanerchor, Gewandhausorchester Leipzig, Agnes Giebel, Johannes Oettel, Berlin / Leipzig Classics 1951
 J. S. Bach: Cantata No. 140, Cantata No. 57, Karl Ristenpart, Chorus of the Conservatory of Sarrebruck, Chamber Orchestra of the Saar, Ursula Buckel, Jakob Stämpfli, Club Francais du Disque 1962
 Les Grandes Cantates de J. S. Bach Vol. 13, Fritz Werner, Heinrich-Schütz-Chor Heilbronn, Pforzheim Chamber Orchestra, Agnes Giebel, Barry McDaniel, Erato 1963
 Bach Cantatas Vol. 15: New York, John Eliot Gardiner, Monteverdi Choir, English Baroque Soloists, Joanne Lunn, Peter Harvey, Soli Deo Gloria 2000
 J. S. Bach: Complete Cantatas Vol. 17, Ton Koopman, Amsterdam Baroque Orchestra & Choir, Sibylla Rubens, Klaus Mertens, Antoine Marchand 2002
 Bach: Dialogue Cantatas · Dialogkantaten, Rainer Kussmaul, RIAS Kammerchor, Berliner Barock Solisten, Dorothea Röschmann, Thomas Quasthoff, Deutsche Grammophon 2007
 J. S. Bach: Cantatas Vol. 43, Masaaki Suzuki, Bach Collegium Japan, Hana Blažíková, Peter Kooy, BIS 2008
 Alfredo Bernardini, Kirchheimer BachConsort, Hana Blažíková, Dominik Wörner J. S. Bach Dialogkantaten BWV 32, 57, 58. cpo, 2016.
Helmut Winschermann Deutsche Bachsolisten Elly Ameling Hermann Prey PHILIPS/1980 LP and CD 10 Festkantaten

References

Sources 
 
 Selig ist der Mann, der die Anfechtung erduldet (Dialogus) BWV 57; BC A 14 / Sacred cantata (2nd Christmas Day) Leipzig University
 Cantata BWV 57 Selig ist der Mann history, scoring, sources for text and music, translations to various languages, discography, discussion, bach-cantatas website
 BWV 57 Selig ist der Mann English translation, University of Vermont
 BWV 57 Selig ist der Mann text, scoring, University of Alberta
 Chapter 7 BWV 57 Selig ist der Mann / Blessed is the Man. Julian Mincham, 2010

External links 
Selig ist der Mann, BWV 57: performance by the Netherlands Bach Society (video and background information)

Church cantatas by Johann Sebastian Bach
1725 compositions
Christmas cantatas